Ajmer is a historical region in central Rajasthan, a central part of a Shakambari Chahamana (Chauhan) kingdom in 11–12th centuries during the reign of Prithviraj Chauhan.

The region includes a present-day Ajmer district and is bounded on the west by Marwar, on the northeast by Dhundhar, on the southeast by Hadoti, and on the south by Mewar regions.

Ajmer subah 
Under Mughal imperial rule, Ajmer was a central subah (top-level province), roughly most of present Rajasthan, one of the twelve original provinces created by Akbar the Great, bordering Delhi (later Shahjahanbad), Agra (later Akbarabad), Malwa, Gujarat, Thatta (Sindh) and Multan subahs.

Ajmer-Merwara
In 1818, Daulat Rao Sindhia, Maharajah of Gwalior State, ceded Ajmer to the British, and it became part of the Bengal Presidency of British India until 1836, when it was moved into the North-Western Provinces. On 1 April 1871 a new Ajmer-Merwara Province (also called Ajmer-Merwara-Kekri) was formed. This continued until 15 August 1947, when with the Partition of India the British departed, and Ajmer-Merwara had been awarded to the new Dominion of India.

Ajmer state 
In 1950, Ajmer state became a "Part C" state, governed by a chief commissioner appointed by the President of India. Haribhau Upadhyaya, a noted Congress leader, was the Chief Minister of Ajmer state from 24 March 1952 to 31 October 1956.
 
Ajmer state was merged into Rajasthan state on 1 November 1956 by the States Reorganisation Act(1956) following the acceptance of suggestions by Fazl Ali Commission. Kishangarh sub-division of erstwhile Jaipur district was added to it to form Ajmer district.

See also 
 Prithviraj Chauhan
 Mohammad Ghauri

Notes 

 
History of Rajasthan
Ajmer